Pietro Lasagni (1814–1885) was an Italian cardinal.

He was ordained a priest on 17 December 1836. Lasagni worked at the nuntiature of Paris from 1842 until 1851. He was an Apostolic delegate in Forlì from 1856 until 1859. Pope Pius IX named him secretary of the Sacred College of Cardinals and the conclave.

Pope Leo XIII created Lasagni a cardinal in the consistory of 13 December 1880.

References

Sources 
 Biography by Salvador Miranda: The Cardinals of the Holy Roman Church

1814 births
1885 deaths
19th-century Italian cardinals
Cardinals created by Pope Leo XIII
People from the Province of Viterbo